Brookton is a town in the Wheatbelt region of Western Australia,  from the state capital, Perth via the Brookton Highway where it crosses the Great Southern Highway. The town is on the Great Southern railway line. It is within, and is the seat of government for, the Shire of Brookton. At the 2016 census, Brookton had a population of 975.

History
The first settler and founder of the Brookton district, John Seabrook (1818–1891), moved to the area in 1846 soon after marrying, and named his property "Brookton House". He remained the only European in the area, aside from itinerant sandalwood cutters, until his stepson,  Robinson, took up adjacent land in 1864. During the 1860s and 1870s, more settlers moved into the area, and took on sandalwood cuttingit sold for as well as wheat and sheep farming.

In June 1889, when the Great Southern Railway opened, Brookton was one of the original stations. The station proved to be the catalyst that created a centre for the isolated farms, and the government gazetted a townsite here in 1895 and named it "Seabrook" but local acceptance of the station name and confusion with another Seabrook near York resulted in the townsite's name being changed to Brookton in 1899. The townsite attracted a few businesses and by 1903, the tiny settlement comprised a school, hotel, bank and a few shops. The Old Police Station Museum located in the town is the base of the local historical society and contains artifacts and memorabilia of the early settlement days.

A bulk wheat bin was opened in December 1940 and began receiving large amounts of grain immediately. In 1941 the wheat harvest of the surrounding area was about  all delivered to the local bulk wheat bin. This was about  bushels down from the previous year.

Present day

In the 2016 census it reported a population of 975. It contains a TAFE centre, and in addition, a district high school (opened 1960, replacing a primary school), Bendigo Bank, shopping facilities, accommodation (hotel, motel, caravan park), council offices and a telecentre are located within the town. Bi-annually, it hosts the Old Time Motor Show.

The town is a stop on the Transwa bus service to Albany.

Climate

References

External links

 Shire of Brookton

Towns in Western Australia
Wheatbelt (Western Australia)
Grain receival points of Western Australia